Howmeh Rural District is in the Central District of Deyr County, Bushehr province, Iran. At the census of 2006, its population was 12,939 in 2,694 households; there were 8,621 inhabitants in 2,155 households at the following census of 2011; and in the most recent census of 2016, the population of the rural district was 2,963 in 775 households. The largest of its 22 villages was Lombadan-e Balai, with 1,256 people.

References 

Rural Districts of Bushehr Province
Populated places in Deyr County